Carlos Santos may refer to:

 Carlos "Carlão" Santos (born 1976), 3-time World Brazilian jiu-jitsu heavyweight champion
 Carlos Santos (archer) (born 1940), Filipino Olympic archer
 Carlos Santos (boxer) (born 1955), former Olympic Puerto Rican boxer
 Carlos Alberto Santos, (born 1960) Brazilian footballer and manager
 Carlos Santos de Jesus (born 1985), Brazilian footballer
 Carlos Morales Santos (born 1968), Paraguayan footballer
 Carlos Santos (actor) (born 1978), Spanish actor
 Carlos Santos (MTV Tr3́s) (born 1981), Puerto Rico-based video jockey on MTV Tr3́s
 Carlos Santos (footballer, born 1989), Portuguese footballer

See also
 Carles Santos (1940-2017), Spanish pianist and creative artist